The Nationalist is a newspaper based in Clonmel in County Tipperary, Ireland which was established in 1890. 

It is a broadsheet newspaper that appears weekly, covering news, events, and sport in both Clonmel town and south Tipperary. It has a circulation of over fourteen thousand in 2010.
It was formed to represent the views of the Irish nationalist community in County Tipperary, which led to the first editor been jailed under a Coercion Act on charges that he had intimidated a cattle dealer for taking a farm from which tenants had been evicted. It supported the Anglo-Irish Treaty, which led to the paper being shut down by Séumas Robinson during the Irish Civil War.

The paper is currently owned by Iconic Newspapers, which acquired Johnston Press's titles in the Republic of Ireland in 2014.

A more recent set of figures, for Jan-June 2011 can be found here.

References

External links

1890 establishments in Ireland
Clonmel
Mass media in County Tipperary
Newspapers published in the Republic of Ireland
Newspapers established in 1890
Weekly newspapers published in Ireland